Jennifer T. Loud is an American nurse practitioner who served as the assistant chief of the National Cancer Institute's clinical genetics branch until August 2020.

Life 
Loud received a B.S. in Nursing from Old Dominion University in 1981, an M.S. in Nursing from George Mason University in 1992, and a Doctor of Nursing Practice degree from the University of Maryland, Baltimore in 2008.

Loud spent seven years as a nurse practitioner with the National Cancer Institute's (NCI) medical oncology branch, working with individuals enrolled in clinical trials of new cancer treatments. During that time, she was a clinical trials coordinator and an associate investigator on two chemoprevention trials for women at increased risk of breast cancer. After joining the NCI division of cancer epidemiology and genetics (DCEG), she earned her doctorate in Nursing Practice from the University of Maryland School of Nursing in 2008, and completed NCI’s year-long Senior Executive Enrichment & Development (STEED) Program in 2009.

In 2008, Loud was appointed assistant chief of the NCI Clinical Genetics Branch.  Her involvement with NCI's Clinical Center institutional review board, first as affiliated scientist and then as deputy chair, established Loud as a resource for human subjects research regulatory matters at NCI. She was a contributor to DCEG’s research portfolio on the behavioral and psychosocial effects of cancer risk assessment and prevention procedures on high-risk individuals. As associate investigator, Loud collected detailed behavioral and psychosocial data to assess the impact of rigorous screening programs on mental health and overall well-being. Prior to her retirement, Loud was assisted in the development and curation of a new web-based data and patient management system. She retired in late August 2020.

Selected works

References 

Living people
Year of birth missing (living people)
Place of birth missing (living people)
American women nurses
21st-century American women scientists
American medical researchers
Women medical researchers
University of Maryland, Baltimore alumni
National Institutes of Health people
Old Dominion University alumni
George Mason University alumni